Tondano may refer to:
 Tondano, a city in Indonesia
 Tondano language, an Austronesian language spoken in Indonesia